Bangasar is a village in Rawatsar tehsil of Hanumangarh district in Rajasthan, India.

Notable people from Bangasar
Akbar Khan - visually impaired Singer, Composer, Writer and a Banker honored with National Award in 1989.

References

Villages in Hanumangarh district